Stephan Sturm (born 1963) is a German businessman, and the chief executive officer (CEO) of Fresenius since July 2016.

Early life
Sturm was born in Worms, Germany in 1963. He earned a degree in business administration from the University of Mannheim.

Career
Sturm began his career in 1989 as a management consultant at McKinsey & Company. Subsequently he served in various positions in the investment banking sector for 13 years, including  BHF Bank, UBS and CSFB.

Sturm served as Chief Financial Officer (CFO) of Fresenius since January 2005, and succeeded Ulf Mark Schneider as CEO, who had been in the role from May 2003 to June 2016.

Sturm initiated the purchase of the Spanish hospital operator Quirónsalud, the largest acquisition in the history of the company,

Other activities

Corporate boards
 Fraport, Member of the Economic Advisory Board (since 2016)
 Fresenius Kabi, Chair of the Supervisory Board (since 2016)
 Vamed, Member of the Supervisory Board
 Lufthansa, Member of the Supervisory Board (since 2015)
 DZ Bank, Member of the Advisory Board

Non-profit organizations
 Robert Koch Foundation, Member of the Board of Trustees

Recognition 
Sturm was named "Chief Financial Officer of the Year 2014" by German Finance magazine.

References

Living people
German chief executives
McKinsey & Company people
University of Mannheim alumni
1963 births
People from Worms, Germany